A towel tablet is a fiber towel that is compressed into the shape and size of a small tablet. The towel tablet expands when water is added to the tablet. Typically the expanded towel size is approximately 26 cm by 20 cm (10" x 8"). Typical uses are for travel, large events, and other situations where these disposable hygiene towels are needed.

The compressed toilet tablet is made from viscose rayon, which is a fiber of regenerated cellulose. It is a β-D-glucose polymer having the empirical formula (C6H10O5)n.

Cellulose is structurally similar to cotton and is generally derived from various plants like soy, bamboo or sugarcane.

See also 
 Dopp kit

References 

Personal hygiene products
Sports equipment
Travel gear